The 2021–22 Swiss Challenge League (referred to as the Dieci Challenge League for sponsoring reasons) was the 19th season of the Swiss Challenge League, the second tier of competitive football in Switzerland, under its current name. The season started on 23 July 2021 and ended on 21 May 2022.

Participating teams
A total of 10 teams participate in the league. 2020–21 Swiss Challenge League champions Grasshopper Club Zürich was promoted to the 2021–22 Swiss Super League. They were replaced by FC Vaduz, who was relegated after finishing last-placed in the 2020–21 Swiss Super League. FC Chiasso was relegated after finishing in last place in the 2020–21 Swiss Challenge League and was replaced by Yverdon-Sport FC, who finished atop the 2020-21 Swiss Promotion League.

Stadia and locations

Personnel and kits

Managerial changes

League table

Results

First and Second Rounds

Third and Fourth Rounds

Statistics

Top scorers

Awards

 On 1 June 2022, FC Thun was awarded the Fair Play Trophy for the dieci Challenge League.

Promotion play-offs

References

External links
 

Swiss Challenge League
2021–22 in Swiss football
Swiss Challenge League seasons